Days and Nights, is a 1944 Soviet drama film directed by Aleksandr Stolper.

Plot 
The film takes place in 1942 in Stalingrad, in which new units of the Red Army arrive to protect the city, including the battalion of Captain Saburov, who was able to knock out the Germans from the buildings they occupied.

Starring 
 Vladimir Solovyov as Capt. Saburov (as V. Solovyov)
 Daniil Sagal as Vanin (as D. Sagal)
 Yuri Lyubimov as Lt. Maslennikov (as Yu. Lyubimov)
 Anna Lisyanskaya as Anya Klimenko (as A. Lisyanskaya)
 Lev Sverdlin as Col. Protsenko (as L. Sverdlin)
 Mikhail Derzhavin as Gen. Matveev (as M. Derzhavin)
 Viktor Klyucharev as Col. Remizov (as V. Klyucharev)
 Anatoliy Alekseev as Petya (as A. Alekseev)
 Fyodor Ivanov as Soldier (as F. Ivanov)
 Andrey Martynov as Soldier (as A. Martynov)
 Vasiliy Galaktionov as Chief of Staff (uncredited)
 Pavel Geraga as Commander of the Front (uncredited)
 Evgeniy Morgunov as Soldier (uncredited)

References

External links 
 

1944 films
1940s Russian-language films
Soviet black-and-white films
Soviet drama films
1944 drama films